Isadora is a proprietary graphic programming environment for Mac OS X and Microsoft Windows, with emphasis on real-time manipulation of digital video. It was first released in 2002. It has support for Open Sound Control and MIDI. Isadora was designed by Mark Coniglio.

References

External links
 Isadora homepage
 Isadora review on Octapod
 Isadora review on VJCentral

Video editing software
Stagecraft software
Sound production
Sound production technology
Digital art
Interactive media
Interactive art
Companies based in Berlin